Caloptilia flavida is a moth of the family Gracillariidae. It is known from China (Hunan and Sichuan) and Thailand.

The larvae feed on Zizyphus jujuba and Zizyphus mauritiana. They mine the leaves of their host plant.

References

flavida
Moths of Asia
Moths described in 1990